Paul Rolland Bebey Kingué (born 9 November 1986) is a Cameroonian former professional footballer.

Career
In June 2006, Roland signed for Douala Athletic Club, before moving to Les Astres FC In 2011, he played for New Stars de Douala.
Rolland has played for Bleid-Gaume since 2012.

In August 2013, Roland joined Tajik League side Khayr Vahdat FK with fellow Cameroonian Gock Habib.

International career
Bebey competed for the Cameroon national football team at the 2008 Summer Olympics.

He was called for the 2010 CEMAC Cup.

Career statistics

Club

International

Statistics accurate as of match played 16 October 2012

References

External links

1986 births
Living people
Cameroonian footballers
Association football defenders
Cameroon international footballers
Footballers at the 2008 Summer Olympics
Olympic footballers of Cameroon
Cameroonian expatriate footballers
Expatriate footballers in Turkey
Expatriate footballers in Belgium
Expatriate footballers in Tajikistan
Expatriate footballers in Belarus
Douala Athletic Club players
Les Astres players
Gaziantep F.K. footballers
FC Neman Grodno players
Tajikistan Higher League players
Cameroon A' international footballers
2011 African Nations Championship players
Cameroonian expatriate sportspeople in Tajikistan
Cameroonian expatriate sportspeople in Belgium
Cameroonian expatriate sportspeople in Turkey
Cameroonian expatriate sportspeople in Belarus